P'unggye-ri is a village located in Kilju County, North Hamgyong Province, North Korea. The Punggye Station serves the village. The Punggye-ri Nuclear Test Site is located nearby.

See also 
 Punggye-ri Nuclear Test Site - The primary nuclear test site in DPRK

Villages in North Korea
North Hamgyong